Narro can refer to:

 House of Narro, Spanish noble lineage
 Jesús Narro Sancho (1922–1987), Spanish footballer
 José Narro Céspedes (b. 1959), Mexican politician
 José Narro Robles (b. 1948), Mexican academic and politician
 Manuel Acuña Narro (1849 – 1873), 19th-century Mexican writer
 Pascual Marquina Narro (1873 – 1948), Spanish orchestral and operatic composer
 Víctor Narro (b. 1999), Spanish footballer

See also
 Naro (disambiguation)
 Narros (disambiguation)
 Narrow (disambiguation)